So Chau Yim-ping, BBS, JP (22 October 1927 – 26 January 2018) was a Hong Kong executive and politician who was a member of the Legislative Council of Hong Kong and Southern District Board.

So Chau Yim-ping had worked in the printing and paper products industry for more than 30 years and was managing director of several printing companies. She is the vice-chairman of supervisory committee of the Hong Kong Printers Association and the president of the Southern District Industrialists Association and the honorary president of the Hong Kong Federation of Women. She is also the honorary trustee of the Hong Kong Baptist University Foundation.

She was appointed to the Southern District Board from April 1985 until September 1994 and elected to the Legislative Council through the West Island electoral college consisting of the Central and Western and Southern District Board members in 1988 Legislative Council election.

She was appointed justice of the peace in 1988 and awarded the Bronze Bauhinia Star in 2001.

References

1927 births
2018 deaths
Hong Kong chief executives
District councillors of Southern District
Hong Kong Civic Association politicians
HK LegCo Members 1988–1991